The Men's team pursuit event of the 2016 UCI Track Cycling World Championships was held on 2 and 3 March 2016. Australia beat Great Britain in the final to win gold.

Results

Qualifying
The qualifying was started on 2 March 2016 at 13:00.

First round
The winners of the first two heats advanced to the final. After that, the results were used to determine the placement rounds. It was started on 3 March 2016 at 15:34.

Finals
The finals were started on 3 March 2016 at 21:45.

References

Men's team pursuit
UCI Track Cycling World Championships – Men's team pursuit